West Endicott Park Carousel is a historic carousel located at Endicott in Broome County, New York. The carousel was purchased about 1929.  The carousel is housed in a wooden, one story, 16-sided, enclosed pavilion. The carousel has 36 figures: 34 horses, one pig and one dog, each of which is a "jumper," and two chariots. It was constructed by the Allan Herschell Company. It is one of six carousels donated to the citizens of Broome County by George F. Johnson (1857–1948), president of Endicott Johnson Corporation.

It was listed on the National Register of Historic Places in 1992.

Other carousels located in the Greater Binghamton Region:
 C. Fred Johnson Park Carousel
 George F. Johnson Recreation Park Carousel
 George W. Johnson Park Carousel
 Highland Park Carousel
 Ross Park Carousel

References

External links
 Visiting information on the Broome County carousels

Buildings and structures in Broome County, New York
Carousels on the National Register of Historic Places in New York (state)
Amusement rides introduced in 1929
Tourist attractions in Broome County, New York
National Register of Historic Places in Broome County, New York